Lobophylliidae is a family of large polyp stony corals. The family was created in 2009 after a revision of the "robust" families of Faviidae, Merulinidae, Mussidae and Pectiniidae, which had been shown to be polyphyletic. The family Lobophylliidae was formed out of the Indo-Pacific species that had traditionally been included in Mussidae, and some of the species which had previously formed Pectiniidae, the remaining species from Pectiniidae having been merged into Merulinidae. The type genus is Lobophyllia.

Taxonomy
The "robust" stony coral families of Faviidae, Merulinidae, Mussidae and Pectiniidae, have traditionally been recognised on morphological grounds but recent molecular analysis has shown that these families are polyphyletic, the similarities between the species having occurred through convergent evolution. Additionally, some traditional genera such as Favia and Scolymia have been found to be polyphyletic, with the Atlantic faviids and scolymids being more closely related to each other than they are to their Indo-Pacific relatives. A revised classification, proposed in 2012, places the Pacific species of Mussidae in a new family, Lobophylliidae and retains the taxon Mussidae for the Atlantic species. 
In the revision, the genera Echinomorpha, Echinophyllia and Oxypora were transferred to Lobophylliidae from Pectiniidae and the genus Moseleya from elsewhere.

Genera
The World Register of Marine Species includes the following genera in the family:

Acanthastrea  Milne Edwards & Haime, 1848
Australophyllia  Benzoni & Arrigoni, 2016
Cynarina  Brüggemann, 1877
Echinomorpha  Veron, 2000
Echinophyllia  Klunzinger, 1879
Homophyllia  Brüggemann, 1877
Lobophyllia  de Blainville, 1830
Micromussa  Veron, 2000
Moseleya  Quelch, 1884
Oxypora  Saville-Kent, 1871
Sclerophyllia  Klunzinger, 1879

References

 
Cnidarian families
Scleractinia